The Northern Illinois District is one of the 35 districts of the Lutheran Church–Missouri Synod (LCMS), and covers the northern third of the state of Illinois, including the Chicago metropolitan area; the rest of the state is divided between the Central Illinois District and the Southern Illinois District. In addition, 26 congregations in the Chicago area (20 of them in the city itself) are in the non-geographic English District, and five congregations in northern Illinois (including one in Chicago) are in the SELC District. The Northern Illinois District includes approximately 226 congregations and missions, subdivided into 28 circuits, as well as 54 preschools, 67 elementary schools and 9 high schools. The district has approximately 127,000baptized members.

The Northern Illinois District was formed in 1907 when the Illinois District was divided. District offices are located in Hillside, Illinois. Delegates from each congregation meet in convention every three years to elect the district president, four vice presidents, circuit counselors, a board of directors, and other officers.  The Rev. Dan Gilbert became the district president in September 2006 was re-elected to a third term in 2012. After the Rev. Dan Gilbert reached his term limits in 2018, Rev. Dr. Allan R. Buss was elected as the district president.

Concordia University Chicago in River Forest, Illinois, part of the LCMS' Concordia University System, is located within the district.

Presidents
Rev. Hermann Engelbrecht, Sr., 1907–09
Rev. William Christian Kohn, 1909–13
Rev. Friedrich Heinrich Brunn, 1913–27
Rev. Alex Ullrich, 1927–36
Rev. Ernest Theodore Lams, 1936–45
Rev. Arthur Henry Werfelmann, 1945–60
Rev. Theodore F. Nickel, 1960–62
Rev. Carl L. Abel, 1962–63
Rev. Erwin L. Paul, 1963–66
Rev. Edmund H. Happel, 1966–85
Rev. Theodore L. Laesch, 1985–97
Rev. William H. Ameiss, 1997-2006
Rev. Dan P. Gilbert, 2006–2018
Rev. Dr. Allan R. Buss, 2018–present

References

External links
Northern Illinois District web site
LCMS: Northern Illinois District
LCMS Congregation Directory

Lutheran Church–Missouri Synod districts
Lutheranism in Illinois
Christian organizations established in 1907
1907 establishments in Illinois